A croline is a flaky (typically puff) pastry parcel filled with various (traditionally) salty or spicy fillings. Normally the top side of the pastry is latticed. Crolines are produced in various shapes and sizes and with different fillings. Though sweet versions are beginning to be produced, typical savoury fillings are mushroom, ham/cheese and salmon/herb. Seafood filled crolines are normally made in a fish shaped pastry.

References

Pastries
Appetizers
Stuffed dishes